Durga Higher Secondary School is situated near Kotachery, at Kanhangad in Kasaragod district, a district in northern Kerala, India.
The school was established in 1948. Kotachery Sarvotham Shenoy, a prominent businessman, investor, philanthropist and Mavila Chandu Nambiar, a prominent landlord of Kanhangad, were among the founders of the school. The school secured first prize in the state level youth festival in Kerala in 2007. The school has a strength of more than 4,000 students and 150 teachers. In 2008 the school was able to keep its top position up in Youth festival, Sanskrit festival and Arabic festival. Giving importance to Sanskrit education is an achievement of Durga Higher Secondary School. Three Sanskrit teachers are available. The school secured first prize in the District School Kalolsavam for many years.

Location
It is 2 km from the old Kanhangad Bus Stand. When travelling by bus, get down at Kailas Theatre Bus stop and proceed eastwards along the sub road (1.5 km) and the road ends at the school.

Education
Students are admitted from the 5th standard and goes up to the 12th standard. Admission to the 5th standard can be had in English, Malayalam or Kannada Medium. Intake for Malayalam medium is the highest, followed by English and then Kannada.

References 

High schools and secondary schools in Kerala
Schools in Kasaragod district
Educational institutions established in 1948
1948 establishments in India